Alice Monkton Duncan-Kemp (1901–1988) was an Australian writer and Indigenous rights activist.

Biography
Born on 3 June 1901 at Charleville, Queensland, Duncan-Kemp was the daughter of William and Laura Duncan (née Davis). She grew up on a leasehold property west of Windorah with her two sisters. Her only brother died in 1903 and her father in 1907, leaving his widow to raise three girls. She elected to remain on the remote property, raising cattle with the assistance of local Aborigines, hired hands and, when they were old enough, Duncan-Kemp and her two sisters.

Educated at home for many years, she completed her schooling at Spreydon College in Toowoomba as a boarder.

She married New Zealander Frederick Clifford Kemp in November 1923 in Longreach with whom she had five children. Previously a grazier, her husband moved into banking and the family moved around rural Queensland with him.

Well ahead of her time, she believed that "Aborigines were the true owners of the land" and understood the devastating effect that white settlement had had on them.

Duncan-Kemp retired to Oakey in Queensland and died there on 4 January 1988. Her husband predeceased her and she was survived by a daughter and two sons, a daughter and son having also died before her.

Works 

 Our Sandhill Country (1933) memoir
 Where Strange Paths Go Down (1952)
 Our Channel Country (1961)
 Where Strange Gods Call (1968)

References 

1901 births
1988 deaths
20th-century Australian women writers
Australian indigenous rights activists
Writers from Queensland